Alexander Laszlo may refer to:
 Alexander Laszlo (scientist) (born 1964), American systems scientist
 Alexander Laszlo (composer) (1895–1970), Hungarian American composer

See also 
 László (disambiguation)